Yakacık - Adnan Kahveci is an underground station on the M4 line of the Istanbul Metro in Kartal. It is located beneath the D.100 State Highway in the Hürriyet neighborhood and is the easternmost station in Kartal. Connection to IETT city buses and Istanbul Minibus service is available. The station consists of an island platform with two tracks and was opened on 10 October 2016.

Station Layout

References

Railway stations opened in 2016
Istanbul metro stations
Kartal
2016 establishments in Turkey